The Multinational Character Set (DMCS or MCS) is a character encoding created in 1983 by Digital Equipment Corporation (DEC) for use in the popular VT220 terminal. It was an 8-bit extension of ASCII that added accented characters, currency symbols, and other character glyphs missing from 7-bit ASCII.  It is only one of the code pages implemented for the VT220 National Replacement Character Set (NRCS). MCS is registered as IBM code page/CCSID 1100 (Multinational Emulation) since 1992. Depending on associated sorting Oracle calls it WE8DEC, N8DEC, DK8DEC, S8DEC, or SF8DEC.
 
Such "extended ASCII" sets were common (the National Replacement Character Set provided sets for more than a dozen European languages), but MCS has the distinction of being the ancestor of ECMA-94 in 1985 and ISO 8859-1 in 1987.

The code chart of MCS with ECMA-94, ISO 8859-1 and the first 256 code points of Unicode have many more similarities than differences. In addition to unused code points, differences from ISO 8859-1 are:

Character set

See also
 Lotus International Character Set (LICS), a very similar character set
 BraSCII, a very similar character set
 8-bit DEC Greek (Code page 1287)
 8-bit DEC Turkish (Code page 1288)
 8-bit DEC Hebrew
 8-bit DEC Cyrillic (KOI-8 Cyrillic)
 8-bit DEC Special Graphics (VT100 Line Drawing) (DEC-SPECIAL)
 8-bit DEC Technical Character Set (DEC-TECHNICAL)
 DEC Kanji (JIS X 0208)

References

Character sets
Digital Equipment Corporation
Computer-related introductions in 1983